Mezquital del Oro is a municipality in the Mexican state of Zacatecas, located approximately  southwest of Zacatecas City, the state capital.

Geography
It borders the Zacatecan municipalities of Trinidad García de la Cadena to the west, Teúl de González Ortega to the north, Juchipila to the northeast, and Moyahua de Estrada to the east. It also borders the Jaliscan municipalities of Ixtlahuacán del Río to the south and San Cristóbal de la Barranca to the southwest.

As of 2009, 5.5% of the land in Mezquital del Oro is used for agriculture. The remainder of the land comprises tropical forest (53.6%), temperate forest (23.6), and grassland (17.2%). The municipality is situated in the drainage basin of the Juchipila River, a tributary of the Río Grande de Santiago. Much of the municipality lies in the canyon of the Mezquital River, a tributary of the Juchipila.

Mezquital del Oro's climate ranges from temperate to tropical depending on elevation, with dry winters in either case.

History
Mezquital del Oro is located in territory that was inhabited by the Caxcan people prior to Spanish contact. The town of Mezquital del Oro was founded in the 1730s after gold was discovered there. Mesquital was named as a district in the partido of Juchipila in 1825. When partidos were abolished in 1916, Mezquital del Oro became an independent municipality. Gold production peaked in the 1910s, and continued until the last mine was abandoned in 1940.

Administration
The municipal government of Mezquital del Oro comprises a president, a councillor (Spanish: síndico), and seven trustees (regidores), four elected by relative majority and three by proportional representation. The current president of the municipality is Mónica Rodarte Dávila.

Demographics
In the 2020 Mexican Census, Mezquital del Oro recorded a population of 2451 inhabitants living in 735 households. The 2010 Census recorded a population of 2584 inhabitants in Mezquital del Oro.

There are 52 inhabited localities in the municipality, of which only the municipal seat, also called Mezquital del Oro, is classified as urban. It recorded a population of 1136 inhabitants in the 2020 Census.

Economy and infrastructure
Nowadays, the main economic activity in Mezquital del Oro is agriculture. In the 2015 Intercensal Survey, 40% of Mezquital del Oro's workforce was employed in the primary sector, 20% in the secondary sector, 7% in commerce, and 32% in services. The main crops grown in Mezquital del Oro are agave, forage grasses, and corn (grain and silage).

Federal Highway 23 runs through the westernmost corner of the municipality, connecting it to Jerez and Fresnillo in the north, and Zapopan and Guadalajara in the south.

References

Municipalities of Zacatecas
1825 establishments in Mexico
States and territories established in 1825